Clubul Sportiv Municipal Bacău, commonly known as CSM Bacău, is a men's handball team from Bacău, Romania. The club was founded in 1962 as Dinamo Bacău and was also known for a period as Știința Municipal Dedeman Bacău, due to sponsorship reasons. The club's best performances are three 2nd places in the Liga Națională, in 2012, 2013 and 2014 and two 3rd places in 1968 and 1980. The team is the handball section of CSM Bacău (Bacău Municipality Sports Club).

The club plays its home matches in Sala Sporturilor from Bacău, a sports hall with a capacity of 2,000 people.

Kits

Honours
Liga Națională:
Runners-up  (3): 2012, 2013, 2014
Third  (2): 1968, 1980

Divizia A:
Winners  (1): 2018
Runners-up  (1): 2016
Third  (1): 2017

References

External links
  
   

 
Romanian handball clubs
Sport in Bacău
Handball clubs established in 1962
1962 establishments in Romania
Liga Națională (men's handball)